Samuel S. Epstein (January 1, 1890–April 21, 1951) was an American lawyer and physician.

Biography
Epstein emigrated to the United States from Russia when he was fourteen years old and settled in Chicago, Illinois. Epstein was educated in the Chicago public schools. He received his bachelor's and medical degrees from Loyola University Chicago in 1914. Epstein served in the Medical Corps of the United States Army during World War I and was commissioned a captain.  He went to John Marshall Law School and was admitted to the Illinois bar in 1941. Epstein practiced law with his daughter in Chicago. He was a Democrat and served as the attorney for the Cook County Democratic Central Committee. Epstein served in the Illinois House of Representatives in 1951 when he died while still in office. Epstein died at Mount Sinai Hospital in Chicago, Illinois.

Notes

External links

1890 births
1951 deaths
Emigrants from the Russian Empire to the United States
Lawyers from Chicago
Politicians from Chicago
Physicians from Illinois
Military personnel from Illinois
Loyola University Chicago alumni
John Marshall Law School (Chicago) alumni
Democratic Party members of the Illinois House of Representatives
20th-century American politicians
20th-century American lawyers